Order of Ennead is the self-titled debut studio album of Tampa based blackened death metal band, Order of Ennead. It was recorded at AudioHammer Studios in Sanford, Florida with producer Mark Lewis.

Track listing
All songs written & arranged by Order of Ennead.

Personnel
Kevin Quirion – vocals, lead & rhythm guitar
John Li – lead & rhythm guitars
Scott Patrick – bass
Steve Asheim – drums, percussion, piano, additional acoustic guitars

Production
Produced by Mark Lewis & Steve Asheim
Recorded, engineered & mixed by Mark Lewis
Mastered by Jim Morris

References

Order of Ennead albums
2008 albums
Earache Records albums